The 7×33mm Sako cartridge was created in Finland in 1942 as a small game cartridge for animals such as the Capercaillie and Black Grouse. It is based on a 9×19mm Parabellum case that has been lengthened and necked down to accept a 7.21mm bullet. The cartridge overall length is 44.30mm with a case length of 33.30mm and a base diameter of 10mm. The bottleneck
bends at 26.50 mm (dia 9.50 mm) and straightens at 29.12 mm (dia 7.80mm). The Bertram company of Australia makes brass for it. Sako offers two loadings, a 78gr (5.1g) FMJ and a 78gr soft nose.

Rifles chambered in this caliber include the Sako Models L42 and L46.

See also
 List of rifle cartridges
 7 mm caliber

References

 https://web.archive.org/web/20080302013841/http://www.thegunzone.com/carbine-wildcat.html
 https://web.archive.org/web/20110714091350/http://www.midwayuk.com/apps/eproductpage.exe/showproduct?SaleItemID=506583
 http://www.ssaa.org.au/stories/historical-collecting-cartridges.html

Pistol and rifle cartridges